"Gypsy Man" is a song written and performed by War.  It was featured on their 1973 album Deliver the Word.

Background
The song was produced by Howard E. Scott, Jerry Goldstein, and Lonnie Jordan.  The album version, started off with a wind sound effect, before a longer instrumental section, sets up the vocal section. It also features more lyrical passages, ending with a longer coda in the harmonica, before the song's fade.

Chart performance
It reached #6 on the U.S. R&B chart and #8 on the U.S. pop chart in 1973.
The song ranked #93 on Billboard magazine's Top 100 singles of 1973.

References

1973 songs
1973 singles
Songs written by Lonnie Jordan
War (American band) songs
Song recordings produced by Jerry Goldstein (producer)
United Artists Records singles